Alireza Rahimi (born January 22, 1952) is the current Vice-President of Asian Handball Federation since 2017 and former President of the Islamic Republic of Iran Handball Federation 2017 to 2019. He was previously the President of three sport clubs including Persepolis Athletic and Cultural Club, Sepahan F.C. based in Isfahan, Iran and Rah Ahan FC. He was a board member of the Islamic Republic of Iran Football Federation and also was the chairman of the Islamic Republic of Iran Handball Federation from 1994 to 2010. He is also a former player of Sepahan.

References

Iranian businesspeople
Iranian football chairmen and investors
Living people
1952 births
Iranian footballers
Sportspeople from Isfahan
Sepahan S.C. footballers
Iranian sports executives and administrators
Association football forwards